Paraborne Aviation was an American aircraft manufacturer based in Kissimmee, Florida. Founded by Scott Alan, the company specialized in the design and manufacture of paramotors.

Paraborne started off as the US distributor for the Goodwin Buckshot wheeled powered parachute design and the Daiichi Kosho Company's foot-launched Beat and Whisper paramotors. When Daiichi Kosho ceased production Alan designed his own derivative aircraft, the Paraborne Backplane, but it was not a commercial success and Paraborne ceased produced and went out of business in about 2004.

Aircraft

References

Defunct aircraft manufacturers of the United States